Chelsea Cornet (born 19 April 1998)  is a Scottish international footballer who currently plays as a midfield for Rangers in the Scottish Women's Premier League.

Career
Cornet started her career at youth level with Loanhead Miners Boys Club and then moving to Hearts Girls before joining Hibernian. She won three SWPL titles and two Scottish Cup titles. She joined Rangers on January 8, 2020.

International career
Cornet has represented Scotland at school, under 15, under 16, under 17, and under 19 level. She played in the 2014 UEFA Women's Under-17 Championship and the 2017 UEFA Women's Under-19 Championship.

Honours

Club
Hibernian
  Scottish Women's Cup:2017, 2018
 Scottish Women's Premier League Cup: 2017 2018 2019

Rangers
 Scottish Women's Premier League 2021-22
 Scottish Women's Premier League Cup: 2022
 City of Glasgow Woman's Cup: 2022,

References

External links
soccerway profile
SFA Profile

Living people
1998 births
Rangers W.F.C. players
Scottish women's footballers
Women's association football midfielders
Scottish Women's Premier League players
Footballers from Edinburgh